Rivets Stadium is a stadium in Loves Park, Illinois.  It is primarily used for baseball, and is the home field of the Rockford Rivets baseball team.  The stadium has 3,279 seats, but can host crowds of over 4,000.  It opened in 2006 as the home of the Rockford RiverHawks, replacing the club's former home, Marinelli Field.

Since 2007, the Rockford College Regents have played their home games at Rivets Stadium.  The field also hosts some Illinois High School Association Super Sectional games.

References

Minor league baseball venues
Baseball venues in Illinois
Sports venues in Rockford, Illinois